Curtis Martin Fraser (born January 12, 1958) is an American former professional ice hockey player who played for the Vancouver Canucks, Chicago Blackhawks and the Minnesota North Stars of the National Hockey League (NHL) between 1978-79 and 1989-90. He featured in the 1982 Stanley Cup Finals with the Canucks.

Fraser was born in Cincinnati while his father played for the International Hockey League's Cincinnati Mohawks, and holds dual citizenship to Canada and the United States. He was raised in Winnipeg and Vancouver. Fraser was diagnosed with diabetes in 1983 and is active in fundraising and awareness efforts for the disease.

Playing career
As a youth, he played in the 1971 Quebec International Pee-Wee Hockey Tournament with a minor ice hockey team from North Vancouver.

Fraser played junior hockey with the Victoria Cougars of the Western Hockey League, where he set franchise records for goals, assists, points, and penalty minutes.  He was then drafted 22nd overall by the Vancouver Canucks in the 1978 NHL Amateur Draft.  He made the team right away and was placed on a line with fellow rookies Thomas Gradin and Stan Smyl.  The trio would be the Canucks' top offensive line for the next four years and play a large role in the club's trip to the 1982 Stanley Cup Finals.

On December 20, 1982, Fraser was traded to the Chicago Black Hawks for Tony Tanti.  He had his best season in Chicago, registering 68 points (29 goals and 39 assists) in only 61 games in 1985–86.  After five years with the Hawks, he was dealt to the Minnesota North Stars on January 2, 1988, for Dirk Graham.  After playing in only 53 games over the next two and a half years with the Stars, his back problems forced him to retire in 1990.

Owing to his dual U.S./Canadian citizenship, Fraser has represented both countries in international tournaments. He played for Canada at the 1978 World Junior Championship and for the USA at the 1987 Canada Cup.

Coaching career
After his playing career ended, Fraser embarked upon a coaching career.  After minor league stops in Milwaukee, Syracuse, and Orlando, Fraser became the first head coach of the Atlanta Thrashers in 1999.  His record was 64–169–46 over three and a half seasons with Atlanta before being fired in 2003.  Since then he has served as an assistant coach with the New York Islanders and St. Louis Blues.

Recently, he has coached the Belarusian national men's ice hockey team at the 2007 and 2008 IIHF World Championships.

On July 23, 2008, the American Hockey League's Grand Rapids Griffins hired Fraser as their head coach, where he served until June 18, 2012, when he was hired by the Dallas Stars as assistant coach. He remained in that position for five seasons.

Fraser was named head coach of Kunlun Red Star of the Kontinental Hockey League (KHL) in the second half of the 2018–19 season. He remained with Kunlun through to the 2019–20 season, unable to guide the Chinese club to the post-season.

Career statistics

Regular season and playoffs

International

Coaching

References

External links

1958 births
American ice hockey coaches
American men's ice hockey left wingers
Atlanta Thrashers coaches
Canadian ice hockey coaches
Canadian ice hockey left wingers
Dallas Stars coaches
Grand Rapids Griffins coaches
Ice hockey people from Ohio
Living people
Minnesota North Stars players
New York Islanders coaches
St. Louis Blues coaches
Sportspeople from Cincinnati
Vancouver Canucks draft picks
Vancouver Canucks players
Victoria Cougars (WHL) players
Ice hockey players from Ohio